DKS may refer to:

 Damus–Kaye–Stansel procedure in cardiovascular surgery
 Dick's Sporting Goods, NYSE stock symbol
 DKS Racing, a team in the 1997 International Formula 3000 Championship
 Dikson Airport,  Russia,  IATA code

 Det Konglig Skaenderi, a society at the Royal Institute of Technology. A university in Stockholm, Sweden.